Kehu may refer to:

Kehu, New Zealand Māori guide in the South Island in the mid-19th century
Kehu language
Te Kehu, New Zealand Māori woman, one of the few female signatories of the Treaty of Waitangi